Gabriela "Gabi" Nicolino de Sá (born 25 August 1989) is a Brazilian sailor. She competed in the Nacra 17 event at the 2020 Summer Olympics.

References

External links
 
 

1989 births
Living people
Brazilian female sailors (sport)
Olympic sailors of Brazil
Sailors at the 2020 Summer Olympics – Nacra 17
Pan American Games medalists in sailing
Pan American Games bronze medalists for Brazil
Sailors at the 2019 Pan American Games
Medalists at the 2019 Pan American Games
Sportspeople from Rio de Janeiro (city)